Vealmoor, Texas is a small town in Howard County, Texas, United States.

History
The land was acquired by C. C. Slaughter in the 1880s. It was on his Lazy S Ranch.

In the early 1920s, Slaughter's sons Robert Lee Slaughter and Dick Slaughter, his daughter Minnie Slaughter Veal, and developer William P. Soash founded the new town via their Lone Star Land Company. The town had a post office by 1926.

The town had 190 inhabitants by 1966 and 179 by 2000.

References

1926 establishments in Texas
Unincorporated communities in Howard County, Texas
Unincorporated communities in Texas